Try My Best (1975–1993) was an American-bred, Irish-trained Thoroughbred racehorse and sire. A son of Northern Dancer, he won the Dewhurst Stakes in 1978 and was the top-rated two-year-old in Britain and Ireland that year.

Background
Try My Best was a bay horse with three white socks bred by E. P. Taylor. Try My Best was sired by Northern Dancer out of the mare Sex Appeal, who also produced his full brother El Gran Senor. The colt was conditioned for racing by the Irish trainer, Vincent O'Brien.

Racing career
At age two Try My Best won the G III Larkspur Stakes at Leopardstown Racecourse in Ireland and the Group One Dewhurst Stakes at Newmarket Racecourse in England. The unbeaten 1977 Champion Two-Year-Old of England and Ireland won the Vauxhall Trial Stakes at Phoenix Park Racecourse at age three in 1978 following which owner Robert Sangster syndicated the colt for US$6 million. Try My Best then shocked his owners and the betting public when he finished last in the Classic 2,000 Guineas Stakes to winner, Roland Gardens. Injured, Try My Best never returned to racing.

Stud record
Try My Best had limited fertility but was notably the sire of: 
 Last Tycoon (b. 1983) – multiple stakes winner in France, England and the United States including the 1986 Group One  Sprint Championship, King's Stand Stakes, and Breeders' Cup Mile. A successful  sire and outstanding sire of sires.
 Waajib (b. 1983) – win Prix du Rond Point (1987), Diomed Stakes (1988), Queen Anne Stakes (1988) Sire of Royal Applause
 My Best Valentine (b. 1990) – durable Group race winner who competed for seven years in England and France. Wins include the Group One Prix de l'Abbaye de Longchamp at age eight.

Try My Best was sent to breeders in Japan in 1992.

Pedigree

References

1975 racehorse births
1993 racehorse deaths
Racehorses bred in Maryland
Racehorses trained in Ireland
Thoroughbred family 8-f